Klek is a village along the Adriatic Sea in southern Dalmatia, Croatia. It is a tourist locality, located in the municipality of Slivno, with a population of 230.
Klek is located near the village of Komarna and the town of Neum, across the border in Bosnia and Herzegovina, right across the peninsula of Klek.

References

Populated places in Dubrovnik-Neretva County